Oxyphosphides are chemical compounds formally containing the group PO, with one phosphorus and one oxygen atom. The phosphorus and oxygen are not bound together as in phosphates or phosphine oxides, instead they are bound separately to the cations (metals), and could be considered as a mixed phosphide-oxide compound. So a compound with OmPn requires cations to balance a negative charge of 2m+3n. The cations will have charges of +2 or +3. The trications are often rare earth elements or actinides. They are in the category of oxy-pnictide compounds.

Many compounds are layered, containing two metals with the formula XZPO, with an XP layer alternating with a ZO layer.

Examples
Examples include 

Ca4P2O greenish gold, has space group I4mmm Z=2 and unit cell parameters a = 4.492, c = 15.087.
Uranium–Copper Oxyphosphide UCuPO semimetallic antiferromagnetic tetragonal ZrCuSiAs-type a =3:7958 c=8:2456 V=118.80 Z=2 MW=348.55 density=9.743
Thorium–Copper Oxyphosphide ThCuPO semimetallic tetragonal ZrCuSiAs-type a=3.8995 c=8.2939 V=126.12 Z=2 MW=342.56 density=9.02.
NpCuOP
Sr2ScCoPO3 high thermoelectric effect
Sr2ScFePO3 superconducting 17K.
LaNiOP Lanthanum nickel oxyphosphide
YOFeP
YOMnP
YOCdP
ROTPn (R = La, Nd, Sm, Gd; T = Mn, Fe, Co, Ni, Cu; Pn = P, As, Sb) 
YZnPO transparent red Rm Z=6 a = 3.946, c = 30.71
LaZnPO transparent red ZrCuSiAs type
DyZnPO transparent red Rm Z=6 a=3.8933 c=30.305
PrZnPO transparent red dimorphic 
SmZnPO  transparent red Rm Z=6 a = 3.946, c = 30.71
NdZnPO transparent a = 3.885 c = 30.32
GdZnPO transparent red Rm Z=6 a=3.922, c = 30.56
CeZnPO transparent
HoZnPO transparent dark red
CeRuPO ferromagnetic below 15K. dimorphic
CeOsPO antiferromagnetic

related phosphide oxides
La2AuP2O  C2/m, a=15.373 b=4.274 c=10.092 β=131.02 V=500.3 dark-red-violet
Ce2AuP2O  C2/m, a = 15.152, b = 4.2463, c = 9.992 pm, β = 130.90° dark-red-violet 
Pr2AuP2O  C2/m, a = 15.036, b = 4.228, c = 9.930 pm, β = 130.88(2)° dark-red-violet  
Nd2AuP2O  C2/m, a = 15.0187, b = 4.2085, c = 9.903 pm, β = 131.12(1)° dark-red-violet

Oxy-pnictides
Related compounds are the oxybismuthides and oxyarsenides.

References

Phosphides
Oxides